Titanium diboride (TiB2) is an extremely hard ceramic which has excellent heat conductivity, oxidation stability and wear resistance. TiB2 is also a reasonable electrical conductor, so it can be used as a cathode material in aluminium smelting and can be shaped by electrical discharge machining.

Physical properties
TiB2 shares some properties with boron carbide and titanium carbide, but many of its properties are superior to those of B4C & TiC:

Exceptional hardness at extreme temperature
2nd hardest material at 3000°C (# diamond)
3rd hardest material at 2800°C (# cBN)
4th hardest material at 2100°C (# B4C)
5th hardest material at 1000°C (# B6O)

Advantages over other borides
Highest boride elastic modulus
Highest boride fracture toughness
Highest boride compressive strength
2nd highest boride melting point (3225 °C) (# HfB2)

Other advantages
High thermal conductivity (60-120 W/(m K)),
High electrical conductivity (~105 S/cm)

Drawbacks
 Difficult to mold due to high melting temperature
 Difficult to sinter due to the high covalent bonding
 Limited to pressing to small Monolithic pieces using of spark plasma sintering

Chemical properties
With respect to chemical stability, TiB2 is more stable in contact with pure iron than tungsten carbide or silicon nitride.

TiB2 is resistant to oxidation in air at temperatures up to 1100 °C, and to hydrochloric and hydrofluoric acids, but reacts with alkalis, nitric acid and sulfuric acid.

Production

TiB2 does not occur naturally in the earth. Titanium diboride powder can be prepared by a variety of high-temperature methods, such as the direct reactions of titanium or its oxides/hydrides, with elemental boron over 1000 °C, carbothermal reduction by thermite reaction of titanium oxide and boron oxide, or hydrogen reduction of boron halides in the presence of the metal or its halides. Among various synthesis routes, electrochemical synthesis and solid state reactions have been developed to prepare finer titanium diboride in large quantity. An example of solid state reaction is the borothermic reduction, which can be illustrated by the following reactions:

(1) 2 TiO2 + B4C + 3C → 2 TiB2 + 4 CO

(2) TiO2 + 3NaBH4 → TiB2 + 2Na(g,l) + NaBO2 + 6H2(g)

The first synthesis route (1), however, cannot produce nanosized powders. Nanocrystalline (5–100 nm) TiB2 was synthesized using the reaction (2) or the following techniques: 
 Solution phase reaction of NaBH4 and TiCl4, followed by annealing the amorphous precursor obtained at 900–1100 °C.
Mechanical alloying of a mixture of elemental Ti and B powders.
Self-propagating high-temperature synthesis process involving addition of varying amounts of NaCl.
Milling assisted self-propagating high-temperature synthesis (MA-SHS).
Solvothermal reaction in benzene of metallic sodium with amorphous boron powder and TiCl4 at 400 °C:
TiCl4 + 2 B + 4 Na → TiB2 + 4 NaCl

Many TiB2 applications are inhibited by economic factors, particularly the costs of densifying a high melting point material - the melting point is about 2970 °C, and, thanks to a layer of titanium dioxide that forms on the surface of the particles of a powder, it is very resistant to sintering. Admixture of about 10% silicon nitride facilitates the sintering, though sintering without silicon nitride has been demonstrated as well.

Thin films of TiB2  can be produced by several techniques. The electroplating of TiB2 layers possess two main advantages compared with physical vapor deposition or chemical vapor deposition: the growing rate of the layer is 200 times higher (up to 5 μm/s) and the inconveniences of covering complex shaped products are dramatically reduced.

Potential applications
Current use of TiB2 appears to be limited to specialized applications in such areas as impact resistant armor, cutting tools, crucibles, neutron absorbers and wear resistant coatings.

TiB2 is extensively used for evaporation boats for vapour coating of aluminium. It is an attractive material for the aluminium industry as an inoculant to refine the grain size when casting aluminium alloys, because of its wettability by and low solubility in molten aluminium and good electrical conductivity.

Thin films of TiB2 can be used to provide wear and corrosion resistance to a cheap and/or tough substrate.

References

Compare
Magnesium diboride

See also

Boride
Titanium carbide
Cermet
Sintering
Hot pressing

Borides
Titanium(IV) compounds
Superhard materials